The First Mithridatic War (89–85 BC) was a war challenging the Roman Republic's expanding empire and rule over the Greek world. In this conflict, the Kingdom of Pontus and many Greek cities rebelling against Roman rule were led by Mithridates VI of Pontus against Rome and the allied Kingdom of Bithynia. The war lasted five years and ended in a Roman victory which forced Mithridates to abandon all of his conquests and return to Pontus. The conflict with Mithridates VI later resumed in two further Mithridatic Wars.

Prelude 
Following his ascension to the throne of Kingdom of Pontus, Mithridates VI of Pontus focused on expanding his kingdom. Mithridates' neighbors, however, were Roman client states, and expansion at their expense would inevitably lead him to conflict with Rome. After successfully incorporating most of the coast around the Black Sea into his kingdom, he turned his attention towards Asia Minor (in particular, the Kingdom of Cappadocia) where his sister Laodice was Queen. He had his brother-in-law, Ariarathes VI, assassinated by a Cappadocian nobleman, Gordius, who had been an ally of Mithradates. The kingdom was thus left in the hands of Laodice, who continued the rule as regent for her son Ariarathes VII of Cappadocia.

Laodice married Nicomedes III of Bithynia, whose country was Pontus' traditional enemy. Nicomedes occupied Cappadocia and Mithridates retaliated by driving him out of Cappadocia and establishing himself as patron of his nephew's kingship on the throne. When Ariarathes refused to welcome Gordius back, Mithridates invaded Cappadocia again and killed Ariarathes. He proceeded to place his son, also called Ariarathes, on the throne of Cappadocia under the guardianship of Gordius.

Nicomedes appealed to the Roman Senate, which decreed that Mithridates be removed from Cappadocia and Nicomedes be removed from Paphlagonia and the Senate appointed Ariobarzanes I of Cappadocia as King of Cappadocia. Mithridates prompted his son-in-law Tigranes the Great of Armenia to invade Cappadocia and remove Ariobarzanes.

The Senate sent special orders to Lucius Cornelius Sulla, the propraetor who was in charge of reducing the pirates infesting Cilicia (south of Cappadocia), and charged him with driving out Mithridates's adherents and the Armenians. After initial difficulties Sulla succeeded and Ariobarzanes was restored to his throne.

In Bithynia Nicomedes III had died. He was succeeded by his son Nicomedes IV. Unfortunately for Nicomedes IV, his bastard half-brother, Socrates Chrestus, supported by Mithridates drove him from his kingdom. Nicomedes fled to Rome and got the support of the Romans who promised to restore him to his throne.

Mithridates main ally, his son-in-law Tigranes, had once again invaded Cappadocia and driven Ariobarzanes from his throne.

The Aquillian legation, 90–89 BC 
In the late summer 90 BC a Senatorial legation was sent east, under Manius Aquillius and Manlius Maltinus, to restore Nicomedes and Ariobarzanes to their kingdoms.  The Senate also sent instructions to Cassius, the Roman governor (probably a propraetor) of the Roman province of Asia, who had a small army and to Mithridates Eupator himself to assist the restorations.

Cassius' small army was probably the standard peacetime garrison force of between a whole and half legion (5 to 10 cohorts) and a few local auxiliary units – certainly no more than 5,000 troops in all. The Aquillian legation soon augmented it with a large force of Galatian and Phrygian auxiliary regiments and with these troops proceeded to restore both monarchs. Mithridates, angry with the Romans, refused to cooperate but neither did he offer opposition and both kings were restored without any fighting in autumn 90 BC.

Its mandate achieved, the Aquillian legation ought to have gone home in winter 90/89 BC. Instead, no doubt on the excuse of keeping Mithridates under observation, it began provoking the Pontic King to war. This was considered to be a very risky and even reckless policy with the Italic War still in the balance.

The kings, Nicomedes in particular, had taken out big loans in Rome to bribe the Senators to vote for their restoration (this decision was a given in accordance with long-term policy in the region, but it appears that by now nothing much was done by the Senate in foreign affairs without accompanying payments from the foreigners with something to gain by Roman intervention). Aquillius' retinue included representatives of the lenders. With Aquillius' support they now urged the two kings to invade the Pontic kingdom to secure the funds with which to repay the loans that had been needed for the bribes.  Fearing the power of Mithridates (and probably aware that the Senate had given no such orders), both kings demurred. But Nicomedes' creditors persisted with their pressure until he at last consented.

It was probably at the end of autumn, 90 BC, that Nicomedes regained control of the Thracian Bosporos and in the new sailing season (from mid-March, 89 BC) he prevented egress from the Euxine to Pontic ships.

Around the middle of spring, 89 BC, Nicomedes invaded the ancient Mithridateian dynastic lands of Mariandynia, plundering as far east as Amastris without encountering resistance. Mithridates had long been preparing a challenge to Roman power and the time was now ripe. As a final means of enlisting as much sympathy as possible in Anatolia, he offered no opposition to the Bithynian raid, preferring to appear as manifestly wronged by what was seen as the puppets and representatives of Rome. The Bithynians returned home with a great deal of plunder – presumably sufficient for Nicomedes to repay his debts.

After the raid Mithridates sent his spokesman Pelopidas to the Roman legates and commanders to make a complaint, apparently against Pergamon. At the same time Mithridates continued with his war preparations, trusting especially in his existing alliance with Tigranes of Armenia, although the more distant connection with Parthia was now without use because his ally Mithridates II had been slain by his rival Sanatruk attacking from the east in summer 91 BC, and a serious internal war persisted between Sanatruk and Mithridates' eldest son and heir Gotarzes I. Eventually the Parthian internal conflict was to seize the entire attention of Tigranes too, but this could not yet be known.  The Pontic king was also exploiting carefully prepared networks of support and recruitment among the Thracians and the Scythians, and now solicited help and alliances from the kings in Syria and from Ptolemy Alexander I and the Cretans.

The Pontic envoy Pelopidas cleverly ignored the fact that Aquillius and his suite had induced the Bithynian raid. Instead he let out propaganda about Roman intolerance towards Mithridates and concluded by appealing to the Treaty between Mithridates and Rome, calling upon the Romans, as friends and allies, to punish or restrain the Bithynian aggressor. Bithynian envoys replied first, citing Pontic aggression against Bithynia and her present king, the ominous Pontic build-up of arms, territory and resources, and alliances – from Armenia to Thrace – while negotiations were still in progress with the Ptolemaic Empire and Seleucid Empire. Such vast preparations, the Bithynians insisted, were aimed not at Bithynia but at Rome herself.  Pelopidas countered by agreeing to let bygones be bygones, and accepting all Roman acta in the East. But he insisted that something must be done about the most recent Bithynian acts of aggression: the closing of the Euxine and the invasion and plunder of Pontic territory. He once again called upon the Romans to honour the letter of the Treaty and help Mithridates punish his attackers, or at least honour its spirit and to stand aside while Mithridates himself took his revenge.

Through Pelopidas' skill in presenting the case, Mithridates' attempt to embarrass and even discredit the Roman representatives succeeded. The latter had made a show of listening fairly to both sides and were now embarrassed by the obvious injustice done to a nominal friend and ally. After a lengthy delay they finally came up with a publicly acceptable pronouncement: the Romans did not wish harm done to their ally Mithridates, nor could they allow war to be made against Nicomedes because it was against the interests of Rome that he be weakened. Pelopidas wished to make something of the insufficiency of this answer, but was ushered out.

Pontic re-occupation of Cappadocia, summer 89 BC 

Mithridates knew enough about the workings of Roman politics to seek redress from the Senate, were he really interested. Instead he wanted to act under the éclat of the recent violation of his territory. After Pelopidas' return he sent his son Ariarathes into Cappadocia with a strong army. The occupation (summer 89 BC) was rapid and once again (now for a fourth time) Ariobarzanes I the philoromaios was expelled and the rule of Mithridates' son enforced. This violated both of the Senatus consulta authorising Aquillius' mission, and the Treaty. It was a strategic move with a view to serious conflict with the Romans: unlike Nicomedes, Ariobarzanes had done naught to offend. It was thus a de facto declaration of war.

The main ancient source, Appian, now states that both sides began to assemble large forces for all-out war, and implies precipitate action by the Pontic King. Instead a Pontic delegation was sent to Rome, and the marshalling of the armies in Anatolia must have taken up the remainder of the year. The Pontic embassy dates to the autumn and early winter 89 BC.

The details of the beginning of the war show that the precipitate action was taken by Aquillius himself, who was clearly keen to begin the war before the Pontic legation returned (even though its chances of success were slim following the reoccupation of Cappadocia, the possibility remained, in the context of the disastrous Italic War losses, that the Senate might prefer to negotiate a settlement and send a new legation to replace the provocative Aquillius). Marius' instructions to Aquillius had probably been to precipitate war and thus present the Senate with a fait accompli. But the present situation was even better from Marius' viewpoint, since the war was now inevitable but still impending: which gave him time to get out to Asia province before it began, if he hurried. However, it was not Marius but Sulla, the newly elected consul, who received the command against Mithridates (autumn 89 BC, probably calendar December).

News of Mithridates' second expulsion of Ariobarzanes (c. July 89 BC) must have reached Rome in September, a month or two before Sulla was elected consul with Pompeius Rufus, for Plutarch records at the time of his entry into office:

Clearly the prevalent view at Rome was that the reoccupation of Cappadocia was the last straw and that the Pontic king should be attacked and deposed. Even more importantly, the winding-down of the Italic War now released the troops necessary to effect this. As for Sulla, he had put himself back in the public eye by a good showing as a commander in the Italic War. He had recently married Metella, widow of the recently deceased princeps senatus M. Aemilius Scaurus and cousin of the praetor Metellus Pius and the young Luculli brothers. He was also close to his colleague, Pompeius Rufus, whose son was already married, with at least one child, to his daughter Cornelia.

Pontic seizure of Roman Asia and Cilicia

Massacre of the Romans and Italians in Asia, c. May 88 BC 

In Bithynia Mithridates received a radical and strange piece of advice from a prominent Greek philosopher at his court, Metrodoros of Skepsis, who was known as ho misoromaios (the Roman-hater) on account of the extremity of his anti-Roman sentiments. Metrodoros suggested that in order to bind the communities of the Roman province to the Pontic cause the king should arrange for the extermination of all Romans in the province without regard to age or sex and force the participation of all the Greek civic authorities, thus shaking off Roman rule permanently and irrevocably.

Soon after securing control of the province in spring 88 BC, Mithridates proceeded with his plans. The massacre was carefully planned and co-ordinated to take the victims by surprise, in every community and all at once. In writing to all the civic authorities of the province, detailing the measures to be taken, the king stipulated that the killings were to be carried out exactly one month after the date of his letter. The date in question is not recorded but fell around early May 88 BC.

What took place on that day profoundly affected Roman/Hellenistic relations. Appian states that 80,000 Romans and Italians were killed in these "Asiatic Vespers", while Plutarch gives a much higher number.

Mithridates vs Rome 
At this point, Mithridates finished capturing Asia Minor and established a presence in Greece. Archelaus was sent to Greece, where he established Aristion as a tyrant in Athens.

The Romans quickly declared war. In 87 BC, Consul Lucius Cornelius Sulla landed in Epirus (western Greece) and marched on Athens. The course of Sulla's expedition has been pieced together through inscriptions (see: Roman Command Structure during First Mithridatic War). Marching into Attica through Boeotia, Sulla found the immediate allegiance of most of its cities, foremost among them Thebes.  Most of the Peloponnese would soon follow after a victory mentioned by Pausanias (1.20.5) and Memnon (22.11).  Athens, nevertheless, remained loyal to Mithridates, despite a bitter siege throughout the winter of 87/6.  Sulla captured Athens on March 1, 86 BC, but Archelaus evacuated Piraeus, and landed in Boeotia, where he was defeated at the Battle of Chaeronea. Philip II of Macedon and a young Alexander the Great had defeated combined Athenian and Theban resistance at Chaeronea 250 years before, securing Macedonian supremacy.

Sulla's siege of Athens, summer 87 – early 86 BC 

Sulla's army took Athens on the Kalends of March, in the consulship of Gaius Marius and Lucius Cornelius Cinna, February 12, 86 BC. The siege of Athens was a long and brutal campaign, and Sulla's rough battle-hardened legions, veterans of the Social War, thoroughly besieged and stormed Athens.
Soon afterwards he captured Athens' harbor of Piraeus, looting and demolishing this area, most of which was destroyed by fire, including architect Philon's famous arsenal.

Caius Scribonius Curio Burbulieus was put in charge of the siege of the Acropolis of Athens, and it was "some time" before Aristion and his followers surrendered when their water ran out (perhaps the late spring). Athens was punished severely, in a show of vengeance that ensured Greece would remain docile during later civil wars and Mithridatic wars.

The Chaeronea campaign 
Even after Sulla seized Piraeus, Archelaeus persisted in exploiting his command of the sea lanes, holding position off Mounychia with his fleet and preventing any food or materiel reaching the city or the Roman army by sea. By the early spring Archelaos' strategy was biting hard. Rocky Attica provided good security for operations against the large Pontic cavalry forces massed in Macedonia, but it was infertile and notoriously incapable even of fully supporting the population of the astu, let alone the large Roman army in addition, with no imports coming in by sea.

Early in the spring of 86 BC, Taxiles concentrated most of his troops, sent word to Archelaos to join him in the Magnetic ports, and marched south from Macedonia into Thessaly. Archelaos rejected the suggestion. He was the senior officer and preferred to persist with his blockade of Attica. Thessaly was only held by a modest Roman observation force under the legatus Lucius Hortensius, elder brother of Quintus Hortensius the orator. But despite his great energy and reputation as an experienced vir militaris, there was little Hortensius could do against the enormous disproportion of the forces descending upon him, other than gather together some Thessalian auxiliary units he had been commissioned to recruit, and fall back southwards.

In about April 86 BC, beginning to run short of supplies and increasingly anxious about Lucius Hortensius' safety, Sulla took the bold decision to quit Attica and march into the fertile plains of Boeotia to feed his army, but also expose it to the great cavalry strength of the Pontic army. This move gave Archelaeus little choice but to sail northward and link up with Taxiles.

In Boeotia, Sulla met and defeated Archelaeus in the Battle of Chaeronea (86 BC). Archelaeus gathered his remaining forces on the island of Euboea where he was reinforced by Mithridates with 80,000 men from Asia Minor. He then returned to mainland Greece where he was again defeated by Sulla, this time at the Battle of Orchomenus. Greece was fully restored to Roman rule.

The Flaccus mission 
By now, Rome had also sent a force under Lucius Valerius Flaccus, to apprehend Sulla and deal with Mithridates.  Flaccus' army passed through Macedonia, crossed the Hellespont and landed in Asia, where many of the Greek cities were in rebellion against Mithridates. This rebellion was prompted in no small part by Mithridates' harsh treatment of the islanders of Chios, whom he ordered into slavery after they allegedly kept back loot collected from the previously massacred Romans of the island.

After crossing the Hellespont, Flaccus was killed in a mutiny led by Flavius Fimbria, who went on to defeat Mithridates and recapture Pergamum. However, his lack of a navy allowed Mithridates to escape immediate danger by sea, as Lucullus, Sulla's admiral, refused to collaborate with Fimbria to prevent Mithridates sailing away from the port. Mithridates met with Sulla at Dardanus later in 85 BC, and accepted terms which restored all his gains in Asia, Cappadocia and Bithynia to their original rulers, but left him his own kingdom, in return for a huge indemnity and the loan of 70 ships to Sulla to return to Rome and face his enemies.

Following this and realizing that he could not face Sulla, Fimbria fell on his sword.  This left Sulla to settle Asia, which he did by imposing a huge indemnity on the Greek cities there, along with demands for five years of back taxes, thus leaving the Asian cities heavily in debt for a long time to come.

References

Ancient sources 
 FHG = Karl Müller (ed.) Fragmenta Historicorum Graecorum
 FGrH = Felix Jacoby (ed. & critical commentary), Die Fragmente der griechischen Historiker (commenced 1923)
 Granius Licinianus
post-Hadrian annalist survives in retrieved fragments, from books XXVI, XXVIII, XXXIII, XXXV and XXXVI of his history, in 5th century uncials of African origin at the bottom of a ter scriptus manuscript palimpsest:  see L. D. Reynolds (ed.) Texts and Transmission: A Survey of the Latin Classics (Oxford, 1983).
- ed. Michael Flemisch Grani Liciniani quae supersunt (G.B. Teubner, Stuttgart, 1904; reprint 1967)
- ed. N. Crinti (Leipzig, 1981)

 Memnon of Herakleia Pontike, 9th century epitome in the ΒΙΒΛΙΟΘΗΚΗ of Photius of Byzantium (codex 224)
- ed. René Henry Photius Bibliothèque Tome IV: Codices 223-229 (Association Guillaume Budé, Paris, 1965), pp. 48–99:  Greek text with French translation
- ed. K. Müller FHG III, 525:  Greek text with Latin translation
- ed. F. Jacoby FGrH no.434:  Greek text, detailed commentary in German

 Phlegon of Tralles fragmenta
- ed. K. Müller FHG III, 602ff.
- ed. F. Jacoby FGrH no.257
- English translations and commentary by William Hansen, Phlegon of Tralles' Book of Marvels (University of Exeter Press, 1996)

 Plutarch Parallel Lives.
- translated by John Dryden, with revision by Arthur Hugh Clough, as Plutarch: Lives of the Noble Grecians and Romans  (London, John Lane The Bodley Head Ltd.)
Caius Marius, pp. 494–524
Sylla, pp. 545–573
The Comparison of Lysander with Sulla, pp. 573–577Cimon, pp. 577–592Lucullus, pp. 592–624The Comparison of Lucullus with Cimon, pp. 624–626
- translated by Rex Warner, with Introductions and notes by Robin Seager, as Fall of the Roman Republic, Six Lives by Plutarch: Marius, Sulla, Crassus, Pompey, Caesar, Cicero (Penguin Books, 1958;  with noted added by Robin Seager, 1972)

 Modern works 
AbbreviationsRE = Real-Encyclopädie der klassischen Altertumswissenschaft, eds. Pauly, Wissowa, Kroll

Major studies
 Bernhardt, H: Chronologie der Mithridatischen Kriege und Aufklärung einiger Teile derselben (University of Marburg dissertation, 1896)
 Gelzer, Matthias:  "L. Licinius Lucullus cos.74", RE vol.XIII (1926), s. v. Licinius no.104, colls.376-414
 Baker, George Philip:  Sulla the Fortunate, Roman General and Dictator, (London, 1927; reprint by Cooper Square Press, 2001)
 Geyer, F:  "Mithridates VI Eupator Dionysos", RE vol.XV (1932), s. v. Mithridates no.12, colls.2163-2205
 Magie, David:  Roman Rule in Asia Minor, 2 vols. (Princeton University, 1950)
 Van Ooteghem, J:  Lucius Licinius Lucullus, (Brussels, 1959)
 Janke, M:  Historische Untersuchungen zu Memnon von Herakleia (University of Würzburg dissertation, 1963)
 McGing, B C:  The Foreign Policy of Mithridates VI Eupator King of Pontus (Mnemosyne Bibliotheca Classica Batava, Supplement no.89, 1986)
 Keaveney, Arthur: Lucullus. A Life. (London/New York: Routledge, 1992). .

Shorter articles and summaries
 Beesley, A.H., The Gracchi Marius and Sulla, 1921.
 Kroll:  "Metrodoros von Skepsis", RE s. v. Metrodoros no.23, colls.1481-2
 Hammond, N. G. L.: "The two battles of Chaeronea (338 B.C. and 86 B.C.)", Klio 31 (1938), 186-218
 Luce, T. J.:  "Marius and the Mithridatic Command", Historia 19 (1970), 161-194
 Olshausen, Eckart:  "Mithradates VI. und Rom", art.25, pp. 806–15 in Hildegard Temporini (ed.) ANRW I.1 (Walter de Gruyter, 1972)
 Lintott, Andrew W.:  "Mithridatica", Historia 25 (1976), 489-91
 Badian, Ernst:  "Rome, Athens and Mithridates", AJAH 1 (1976), 105-128
 Glew, Dennis G.:
- "Mithridates Eupator and Rome: A Study of the Background of the First Mithridatic War", Athenaeum 55 (1977), 380-405
- "The Selling of the King: A Note on Mithridates Eupator's Propaganda in 88 B.C.", Hermes 105 (1977), 253-56
 Sherwin-White, Adrian Nicholas:  "Ariobarzanes, Mithridates, and Sulla", Classical Quarterly n.s.27 (1977), 173-183
 Alexander, Michael C.:  "The Legatio Asiatica of Scaurus: Did it take place?", TAPA 111 (1981), 1-9
 Leydold, Miran: "Wann eroberte Mithridates die Provinz Asia?", Klio 102 (2020), 579-600

Further reading

Burcu Erciyas, Deniz. 2005. Wealth, aristocracy and royal propaganda under the Hellenistic kingdom of the Mithridatids in the central Black Sea region of Turkey. Leiden: Brill.
Gabrielsen, Vincent, and John Lund, eds. 2007. The Black Sea in Antiquity: Regional and interregional economic exchanges. Aarhus, Denmark: Aarhus University Press.
McGing, Brian C. 1986. The foreign policy of Mithridates VI Eupator king of Pontos. Leiden: Brill.
Sherwin-White, Adrian N. 1984. Roman foreign policy in the East 168 B.C. to A.D. 1. London: Duckworth.
Sullivan, Richard D. 1990. Near Eastern royalty and Rome: 100–30 B.C.'' Toronto: University of Toronto Press.

89 BC
88 BC
87 BC
86 BC
85 BC
80s BC conflicts
1st century BC in the Roman Republic
1
Wars involving the Roman Republic
Mithradatic